Tomás Díaz (born 24 April 1997) is an Argentine professional footballer who plays as a forward.

Career
Díaz came through the youth ranks of Independiente. He moved to Barracas Central in 2018, subsequently appearing in Primera B Metropolitana for his professional debut on 25 August versus Almirante Brown; he came off the bench, as he did days later against Defensores Unidos. Díaz made his first start on 2 September in a victory over Justo José de Urquiza, with the forward also scoring the opening goal of a 1–2 win.

Sepsi OSK Sfântu Gheorghe
On 29 January 2020, Díaz signed a one-and-a-half-year contract with Romanian club Sepsi OSK.

Career statistics

Honours
Barracas Central
Primera B Metropolitana: 2018–19

References

External links

1997 births
Living people
Place of birth missing (living people)
Argentine footballers
Association football forwards
Primera B Metropolitana players
Barracas Central players
Club Atlético Atlanta footballers
Sepsi OSK Sfântu Gheorghe players
AFC Chindia Târgoviște players
Liga I players
Expatriate footballers in Romania
Argentine expatriate sportspeople in Romania